Cyperus alopecuroides, commonly known as the foxtail flatsedge, is a sedge of the family Cyperaceae that is native to parts of Africa, Asia and Australia.

Description
It has few glabrous culms that have triangular cross section.

Taxonomy
The species was first described in 1773 by the botanist Christen Friis Rottbøll in the work Descriptionum et Iconum Rariores. There are nine synonyms including; Chlorocyperus alopecuroides, Cyperus bidentatus, Cyperus glomeratus, Juncellus alopecuroides and Juncellus pallidiflorus.

Distribution
The plant is found in parts of Africa from Egypt to Eswatini in parts of Asia including Yemen, Saudi Arabia, Pakistanm and India. It is also found in parts of northern Australia. In Western Australia, it is found around lakes and swamps in the eastern Kimberley region extending across northern parts of the Northern Territory and Queensland.

See also
List of Cyperus species

References

Plants described in 1773
Flora of Western Australia
alopecuroides
Taxa named by Christen Friis Rottbøll
Flora of the Northern Territory
Flora of Queensland
Flora of Angola
Flora of Bangladesh
Flora of Benin
Flora of Botswana
Flora of Burkina Faso
Flora of Chad
Flora of the Comoros
Flora of Egypt
Flora of Eritrea
Flora of Ethiopia
Flora of India
Flora of Ghana
Flora of Ivory Coast
Flora of Indonesia
Flora of Kenya
Flora of Syria
Flora of Madagascar
Flora of Mali
Flora of Malawi
Flora of Mauritania
Flora of Mozambique
Flora of Niger
Flora of Nigeria
Flora of Pakistan
Flora of Saudi Arabia
Flora of Senegal
Flora of Seychelles
Flora of Somalia
Flora of Sri Lanka
Flora of Sudan
Flora of Swaziland
Flora of Tanzania
Flora of Togo
Flora of Vietnam
Flora of Yemen
Flora of Zambia
Flora of Zimbabwe